In the United Kingdom, Australia, Hong Kong, Ireland, and certain other English common law jurisdictions, a trainee solicitor is a prospective lawyer undergoing professional training at a law firm or an in-house legal team to qualify as a full-fledged solicitor.  This period of training is known as a training contract and usually lasts for two years.

The barrister's equivalent would be twelve months' pupillage under a pupilmaster, in barristers' chambers, or for advocates in Scotland, eight or nine months devilling under a devilmaster.

Route

England and Wales 
Before they are eligible to train, the trainee must first have an undergraduate degree in law, or another degree and later taken a conversion course (i.e. the Common Professional Examination or Graduate Diploma in Law), and then completed the Legal Practice Course (LPC). The LPC and the training contract may be taken at the same time part-time.

During the training contract, trainees are required to gain practical experience in at least three distinctive areas of law. On successful completion of the training contract, the trainee will qualify and be admitted as a solicitor.

Trainee solicitors and training contracts were formerly known as articled clerks and articles of clerkship, respectively.

For trainee solicitors, the Law Society recommend a minimum salary of £22,794 in London and £20,217 outside of London. However, this is not binding owing to the removal of a regulatory minimum salary by the SRA in 2014. Firms are now required to pay no more than the national minimum wage.

Scotland 
In Scotland the system is similar to that in England and Wales. In order to become a trainee solicitor, the student must complete an undergraduate degree in law, or complete the Law Society of Scotland examinations, before undertaking a one-year Diploma in Legal Practice. This qualifies the graduate to receive an Entrance Certificate and begin a traineeship.

Traineeships are obtained through the open job market and there is no guarantee that a graduate will secure one. Over the last five years, 24% of Diploma graduates have not started traineeships.

Trainees must complete at least 60 hours of Trainee Continuing Professional Development. After three months, the trainee can apply for admission as a solicitor, allowing them to appear in court.

On successful completion of the traineeship, the traineeship is discharged and the trainee will be eligible for a Practising Certificate.

Work placements 
Work placements allow students a brief (normally two-week) experience within the working environment of a firm of solicitors. Interested students may find local opportunities through their school's or university's career adviser, or apply direct to the firms of solicitors.

Assessed work placements in law firms, which often include a formal interview for a traineeship towards the end of the placement, are also known as vacation schemes.

Hong Kong 
In Hong Kong, the route is generally identical to that in England and Wales, save with the substitution of the Postgraduate Certificate in Laws course for the LPC.

Canada

Each of the provincial and territorial jurisdictions offer similar routes to other Commonwealth jurisdictions, typically by way of articles or stage.  The province of Ontario, for example offers experiential training, by way of articles of clerkship or the Law Practice Program.

References

External links
The Law Society of England & Wales
The Solicitors Regulation Authority
TraineeSolicitor.co.uk
Trainee Solicitor Surgery
The Student's Guide to Legal Careers
Automated Solicitors Work placement application form

Legal professions
Solicitors
Beginners and newcomers